Mrs Martha Bardell is a fictional character in The Pickwick Papers (1836), the first novel by Charles Dickens. A widow and the landlady of Mr Pickwick, a romantic misunderstanding between the two results in one of the most famous fictional legal cases in English literature, Bardell v. Pickwick, leading to them both being incarcerated in the Fleet Prison for debt.

Background

Mrs Martha Bardell is a widow, "the relict and sole executrix of a deceased custom–house officer ... a comely woman of bustling manners and agreeable appearance, with a natural genius for cooking, improved by study and long practice, into an exquisite talent." With her young son she lives on Goswell Street in London where she provides lodgings for two lodgers including retired businessman Mr Pickwick, the latter taking two rooms at the front of the house. Mrs Bardell develops an affection for Pickwick and regards him as a potential marriage partner. Having no servant, the hardworking landlady Mrs. Bardell looked after the needs of her young son Tommy Bardell and those of her two lodgers single-handed. Her Counsel, Mr. Serjeant Buzfuz, later described the services she provided for Pickwick: "She waited on him, attended to his comforts, cooked his meals, looked out his linen for the washer-woman when it went abroad, darned, aired, and prepared it for his wear when it came home, and, in short, enjoyed his fullest trust and confidence."

The proposal of marriage

When Pickwick discusses with Mrs Bardell his idea of taking a servant (Sam Weller), expressing the view that three may eat as cheaply as two, she mistakes this for a marriage proposal and accepting his 'offer', much to his dismay, faints into his arms, possibly deliberately, as his three friends Winkle, Snodgrass and Tupman walk through the door and witness the scene:
“Mrs. Bardell,” said Mr. Pickwick, at the expiration of a few minutes.

“Sir,” said Mrs. Bardell again.

“Do you think it a much greater expense to keep two people, than to keep one?”

“La, Mr. Pickwick,” said Mrs. Bardell, colouring up to the very border of her cap, as she fancied she observed a species of matrimonial twinkle in the eyes of her lodger; “La, Mr. Pickwick, what a question!”

“Well, but do you?” inquired Mr. Pickwick.

“That depends,” said Mrs. Bardell, approaching the duster very near to Mr. Pickwick’s elbow which was planted on the table. “That depends a good deal upon the person, you know, Mr. Pickwick; and whether it’s a saving and careful person, sir.”

“That’s very true,” said Mr. Pickwick, “but the person I have in my eye (here he looked very hard at Mrs. Bardell) I think possesses these qualities; and has, moreover, a considerable knowledge of the world, and a great deal of sharpness, Mrs. Bardell, which may be of material use to me.”

“La, Mr. Pickwick,” said Mrs. Bardell, the crimson rising to her cap-border again.

“I do,” said Mr. Pickwick, growing energetic, as was his wont in speaking of a subject which interested him—“I do, indeed; and to tell you the truth, Mrs. Bardell, I have made up my mind.”

“Dear me, sir,” exclaimed Mrs. Bardell.

“You’ll think it very strange now,” said the amiable Mr. Pickwick, with a good-humoured glance at his companion, “that I never consulted you about this matter, and never even mentioned it, till I sent your little boy out this morning—eh?”

Mrs. Bardell could only reply by a look. She had long worshipped Mr. Pickwick at a distance, but here she was, all at once, raised to a pinnacle to which her wildest and most extravagant hopes had never dared to aspire. Mr. Pickwick was going to propose—a deliberate plan, too—sent her little boy to the Borough, to get him out of the way—how thoughtful—how considerate!

“Well,” said Mr. Pickwick, “what do you think?”

“Oh, Mr. Pickwick,” said Mrs. Bardell, trembling with agitation, “you’re very kind, sir.”

“It’ll save you a good deal of trouble, won’t it?” said Mr. Pickwick.

“Oh, I never thought anything of the trouble, sir,” replied Mrs. Bardell; “and, of course, I should take more trouble to please you then, than ever; but it is so kind of you, Mr. Pickwick, to have so much consideration for my loneliness.”

“Ah, to be sure,” said Mr. Pickwick; “I never thought of that. When I am in town, you’ll always have somebody to sit with you. To be sure, so you will.”

“I am sure I ought to be a very happy woman,” said Mrs. Bardell.

“And your little boy—” said Mr. Pickwick.

“Bless his heart!” interposed Mrs. Bardell, with a maternal sob.

"He, too, will have a companion," resumed Mr. Pickwick, "a lively one, who'll teach him, I'll be bound, more tricks in a week than he would ever learn in a year." And Mr. Pickwick smiled placidly.

"Oh, you dear —" said Mrs. Bardell.

"Bless my soul," cried the astonished Mr. Pickwick; "Mrs. Bardell, my good woman — dear me, what a situation — pray consider. — Mrs. Bardell, don't — if anybody should come —"

"Oh, let them come," exclaimed Mrs. Bardell frantically; "I'll never leave you — dear, kind, good soul;" and, with these words, Mrs. Bardell clung the tighter.

"Mercy upon me," said Mr. Pickwick, struggling violently, "I hear somebody coming up the stairs. Don't, don't, there's a good creature, don't." But entreaty and remonstrance were alike unavailing; for Mrs. Bardell had fainted in Mr. Pickwick's arms; and before he could gain time to deposit her on a chair, Master Bardell entered the room, ushering in Mr. Tupman, Mr. Winkle, and Mr. Snodgrass.

Mr. Pickwick was struck motionless and speechless. He stood with his lovely burden in his arms, gazing vacantly on the countenances of his friends, without the slightest attempt at recognition or explanation. They, in their turn, stared at him; and Master Bardell, in his turn, stared at everybody.

The astonishment of the Pickwickians was so absorbing, and the perplexity of Mr. Pickwick was so extreme, that they might have remained in exactly the same relative situations until the suspended animation of the lady was restored, had it not been for a most beautiful and touching expression of filial affection on the part of her youthful son. Clad in a tight suit of corduroy, spangled with brass buttons of a very considerable size, he at first stood at the door astounded and uncertain; but by degrees, the impression that his mother must have suffered some personal damage pervaded his partially developed mind, and considering Mr. Pickwick as the aggressor, he set up an appalling and semi-earthly kind of howling, and butting forward with his head, commenced assailing that immortal gentleman about the back and legs, with such blows and pinches as the strength of his arm, and the violence of his excitement, allowed.

"Take this little villain away," said the agonised Mr. Pickwick, "he's mad."

"What is the matter?" said the three tongue-tied Pickwickians.

"I don’t know," replied Mr. Pickwick pettishly. "Take away the boy." (Here Mr. Winkle carried the interesting boy, screaming and struggling, to the farther end of the apartment.) "Now help me, lead this woman downstairs."

"Oh, I am better now," said Mrs. Bardell, faintly.

"Let me lead you downstairs," said the ever gallant Mr. Tupman.

"Thank you, sir — thank you?" exclaimed Mrs. Bardell hysterically.  And downstairs she was led accordingly, accompanied by her affectionate son.

"I cannot conceive—" said Mr. Pickwick, when his friend returned — "I cannot conceive what has been the matter with that woman.  I had merely announced to her my intention of keeping a man servant, when she fell into the extraordinary paroxysm in which you found her.  Very extraordinary thing."

"Very," said his three friends.

"Placed me in such an extremely awkward situation," continued Mr. Pickwick.

"Very," was the reply of his followers, as they coughed slightly, and looked dubiously at each other.

This behaviour was not lost upon Mr. Pickwick.  He remarked their incredulity.  They evidently suspected him.

Bardell v. Pickwick

When Pickwick refuses to marry her Mrs Bardell is persuaded by the unscrupulous lawyers Dodson and Fogg into bringing a breach of promise to marry suit against Pickwick in Bardell v. Pickwick, one of the most famous fictional legal cases in English literature. During the trial at the Guildhall Sittings in London before Mr. Justice Stareleigh, Mr. Serjeant Buzfuz prosecutes Pickwick and bullies the witnesses into giving incriminating testimony, leading to Pickwick being falsely convicted; he is imprisoned in the Fleet Prison for refusing to pay the fines awarded against him. Eventually Mrs. Bardell too is sent to the same prison by her attorneys for not paying their fees. Pickwick learns that the only way he can relieve her suffering is by paying her costs in the action against himself, thus at the same time releasing himself from the prison.

Legacy

Bardell Rock, south of Dickens Rocks in the Pitt Islands, northern Biscoe Islands, was named by the UK Antarctic Place-Names Committee in 1971 after Mrs Bardell.

Notable portrayals
Mrs Melville - Samuel Weller, or, The Pickwickians (1837)
Lottie Venne - in the operetta Pickwick (1889)
Jessie Bond - in a revival of the operetta Pickwick (1893–94)
Laura Joyce Bell - Mr. Pickwick (1903) at the Herald Square Theatre and later the Grand Opera House.
Mary Brough - The Adventures of Mr. Pickwick (1921)
Hermione Baddeley - The Pickwick Papers (1952)
Edna Morris - Bardell V. Pickwick (1955)  
Jessie Evans - in the West End musical Pickwick (1963)
Charlotte Rae - in the Broadway musical Pickwick (1965)
Hattie Jacques - Pickwick (1969)
Jo Kendall - The Pickwick Papers (1985)

References

External links 
Percy Fitzgerald. Full text of Bardell v. Pickwick, (1902) Project Gutenberg eBook

Charles Dickens characters
The Pickwick Papers
Fictional people from London
Literary characters introduced in 1836
Female characters in literature
Comedy literature characters
Inmates of Fleet Prison
Female characters in film
Female characters in television
Fictional landlords